Obernholz is a municipality in the district of Gifhorn, in Lower Saxony, Germany. Obernholz includes the little villages of Bottendorf, Steimke, Schweimke, Wettendorf, Wentorf and Wierstorf.

References

Gifhorn (district)